René Roels (born 3 September 1937, in Sint-Niklaas, Oost-Vlaanderen) is a Belgian sprint canoer who competed in the mid-1960s. At the 1964 Summer Olympics, he was eliminated in the semifinals of the K-2 1000 m event while withdrawing prior to the heats of the K-1 1000 m event.

References
Sports-reference.com René Roels profile

1937 births
Belgian male canoeists
Canoeists at the 1964 Summer Olympics
Living people
Olympic canoeists of Belgium
Sportspeople from Sint-Niklaas